John Sellars may refer to:
 John Sellars (academic administrator)
 John Sellars (footballer)
 John Sellars (sport shooter)

See also
 John Sellers (disambiguation)